The 12471 / 12472 Swaraj Express is a Superfast Express train belonging to Northern Railways Zone that runs between  and  in India.

It operates as train number 12471 from Bandra Terminus to Shri Mata Vaishno Devi Katra and as train number 12472 in the reverse direction.

Later it was transferred to Bandra Terminus.

Coaches

The train consists of 22 coaches:
 1 AC I 
 2 AC II Tier
 5 AC III Tier
 10 Sleeper coaches
 1 Pantry car
 2 General Unreserved
 2 End-on generator

As with most train services in India, coach composition may be amended at the discretion of Indian Railways depending on demand.

Service

12471 Bandra Terminus–Shri Mata Vaishno Devi Katra Swaraj Express covers the distance of 2030 kilometres in 33 hours 15 mins (63.41 km/h) & 2030 kilometres in 32 hours 55 mins (63.24 km/h) as 12472 Shri Mata Vaishno Devi Katra–Bandra Terminus Swaraj Express.

As the average speed of the train is above 55 km/hr, as per Indian Railways rules, its fare includes a Superfast surcharge.

Route & halts

Rake sharing

This train shares its rake with,

 12473/12474 Gandhidham–Shri Mata Vaishno Devi Katra Sarvodaya Express
 12475/12476 Hapa–Shri Mata Vaishno Devi Katra Sarvodaya Express
 12477/12478 Jamnagar–Shri Mata Vaishno Devi Katra Express

Traction

It is now regularly hauled by a Ghaziabad-based WAP-7 (HOG)-equipped locomotives from end to end.

External links

References 

Transport in Katra, Jammu and Kashmir
Transport in Mumbai
Named passenger trains of India
Rail transport in Madhya Pradesh
Rail transport in Delhi
Rail transport in Maharashtra
Rail transport in Gujarat
Rail transport in Rajasthan
Rail transport in Jammu and Kashmir
Rail transport in Punjab, India
Rail transport in Haryana
Railway services introduced in 1976
Express trains in India